Michelle Reininger is an assistant professor at Stanford University and currently serves as the executive director of the Center for Education Policy Analysis (CEPA).

Biography

Michelle Reininger earned a B.A. in biochemistry from the University of Colorado in 1996, followed by a M.A. in leadership, foundations and policy from the Curry School of Education at the University of Virginia in 2001, a M.A. in economics from Stanford University in 2004, and a Ph.D. in social sciences, policy and educational practice from Stanford's School of Education in 2006. After her Ph.D., Reininger became an assistant professor of human development and social policy and learning sciences at Northwestern University and a faculty fellow at the Institute for Policy Research, Northwestern University, with which she maintains an affiliation. She subsequently returned to Stanford to become the executive director of Stanford's Center for Education Policy Analysis, wherein she is also involved CEPA's School Leadership Research.

Her research work has focused mostly on the dynamics of the labour markets of teachers and principals, including their training, recruitment and retention.

References

External links

  Webpage of Michelle Reininger on the website of CEPA

Year of birth missing (living people)
Living people
University of Colorado alumni
Curry School of Education alumni
Stanford University School of Humanities and Sciences alumni
Stanford Graduate School of Education alumni
Educational researchers
Northwestern University faculty
Stanford University faculty